The Incan little mastiff bat (Mormopterus phrudus) is a species of bat in the family Molossidae, the free-tailed bats. It belongs to the subgenus Micronomus.

Taxonomy and etymology
It was described as a new species by American zoologist Charles O. Handley. Although the holotype had been collected in 1915 by Edmund Heller, it was not scientifically described until 1956. Its species name "phrudus" comes from Ancient Greek "phroudos," meaning "gone" or "disappeared." Handley chose this name "with allusion to their type locality, the 'Lost City' of Machu Picchu..." Along with Kalinowski's mastiff bat, it is one of only two species of Mormopterus in the New World.

Description
Its fur is dark brown. Its ears are thin, rounded, and not conjoined as in some other free-tailed bats. It has a small tragus with a pointed tip and an inconspicuous antitragus.
Its lips are slightly wrinkled. Males, at least, have a gular gland.

Biology and ecology
Little is known about the biology of the bat. It may be a microendemic species.

Range and habitat
It occurs in lowland subtropical forest.

Conservation
This bat is endemic to Peru, where it is known only from one location; its type locality at Machu Picchu. It is considered a vulnerable species by the International Union for Conservation of Nature (IUCN) and a critically endangered species by the nation of Peru; though it is rare, it lives in a protected area.

References

Mormopterus
Endemic fauna of Peru
Mammals of Peru
Mammals of the Andes
Mammals described in 1956
Bats of South America